Wola Malkowska  is a village in the administrative district of Gmina Bogoria, within Staszów County, Świętokrzyskie Voivodeship, in south-central Poland.

The village has a population of  224.

Demography 
According to the 2002 Poland census, there were 244 people residing in Wola Malkowska village, of whom 48.8% were male and 51.2% were female. In the village, the population was spread out, with 23.4% under the age of 18, 32.4% from 18 to 44, 17.2% from 45 to 64, and 27% who were 65 years of age or older.
 Figure 1. Population pyramid of village in 2002 — by age group and sex

References

Wola Malkowska